Duke of Aosta was a title in the Italian nobility. It was established in the 13th century when Frederick II, Holy Roman Emperor, made the County of Aosta a duchy. The region was part of the Savoyard state and the title was granted to various princes of the House of Savoy, second sons of the reigning king of Sardinia or king of Italy.

The title was re-created in 1845 for Prince Amadeo, son of Victor Emmanuel II, and thereafter held by him and his descendants until the abolition of the Italian monarchy in 1946. Two holders briefly served as kings of European countries – Prince Amadeo ruled as king of Spain from 1870 to 1873, while his grandson Prince Aimone was titular king of Croatia from 1941 to 1943 during the Italian-backed fascist regime.

The subsidiary titles of the Duke of Aosta were Prince della Cisterna and of Belriguardo, Marquess of Voghera, and Count of Ponderano, originating from the heritage of Maria Vittoria dal Pozzo, the mother of Duke Emanuele Filiberto. Ponderano was created in 1559, Voghera in 1618; Cisterna and Belriguardo as princely in 1670.

Duke of Aosta, 1701–1715

Duke of Aosta, 1723–1725

Duke of Aosta, 1731–1735

Duke of Aosta, 1738–1745

Duke of Aosta, 1759–1802

Duke of Aosta, 1845–present

See also
 Duchess of Aosta

References

External links

 
Lists of Italian nobility
Dukedoms of Italy
Lists of dukes
1701 establishments in Italy